The Commonwealth Lawyers Association (CLA) is an organisation of lawyers, law societies and bar associations across the Commonwealth of Nations.

The association hosts a conference in a member nation of the commonwealth biennially.

History 
The CLA began as the Commonwealth & Empire Law Conference, first held in London in 1955. The Commonwealth Legal Bureau was subsequently established in 1968. The first Commonwealth Law Conference was held in Scotland in 1977. At the Commonwealth Law Conference held in Hong Kong in 1983 it was agreed that the CLB should be replaced by the Commonwealth Lawyers’ Association (CLA) and a Constitution was subsequently adopted in Jamaica in 1986.

References

External links 
Commonwealth Lawyers Association

Commonwealth Family
Organisations based in Kent
1986 establishments in the United Kingdom
Organizations established in 1986
Canterbury